Haworthiopsis scabra, formerly Haworthia scabra, is a species of flowering succulent plant from arid regions of the Western and Eastern Cape Provinces, South Africa.

Description
Haworthiopsis scabra is a very variable species, with several very distinct varieties. Its name "scabra" means "rough", but only its type-variety truly has rough leaves. It typically grows its leaves in three tiers (trifarious) though some varieties have five-tier leaf arrangement. Many varieties have a spiral twist to their leaves.

Varieties

 H. s. var. scabra (Haw.) The widespread type-variety; dark and rough from dense tubercles
 H. s. var. plettens (Bayer) Rough surface (small tubercles)
 H. s. var. starkiana (Poelln.) Smooth variety, light coloured and without tubercles 
 H. s. var. lateganiae (Poelln.) Larger, smooth, offsetting variety with long, thin leaves
 H. s. var. smitii A variety from the Small Karoo (South Africa), with few large tubercles and raised margins and keels
 H. s. var. morrisiae (Poelln.) Intermediate, banded variety with confluent tubercles
 H. s. var. johanii (Breuer, Hayashi) Long-leaved offsetting variety

The flowers typically appear in November and December.

Taxonomy
The species was previously including in Haworthia subgenus Hexangulares. Phylogenetic studies  demonstrated that subgenus Hexangulares was actually relatively unrelated to other haworthias and so it was moved to the new genus Haworthiopsis.

Distribution
This species extends across the southern part of South Africa in the arid Little Karoo region. Here it grows on both sides of the border between the Western and Eastern Cape Provinces, from Ladismith in the West to Baviaanskloof in the East.

Within this range, it typically grows in very well-drained sandy soil, usually under a bush or rocks which serve as partial protection from the sun.

Cultivation
It is very slow growing and is not common in cultivation. It requires extremely well-drained soil and minimal water. They thrive in shady conditions, though some varieties such as starkiana'' can be adjusted gradually to full sun.

References

scabra
Flora of the Cape Provinces
Endemic flora of South Africa